A Flight and a Crash is a punk rock album by Hot Water Music, released in 2001 by Epitaph Records. It was Hot Water Music's first release on Epitaph Records, and the band's fourth studio album. The album peaked at 49 on Billboard's Top Independent Album chart.

Track listing

References

Hot Water Music albums
2001 albums
Epitaph Records albums